The J-Mack Ferry (also called J-Mac Ferry, Steamboat Slough Ferry, or Grand Island Ferry) is a cable ferry that operates between Ryde and Ryer Island, crossing Steamboat Slough in the Sacramento-San Joaquin River Delta in Solano County, California. The California Department of Transportation (Caltrans) operates the vehicle roll-on/roll-off service, which is classified as part of California State Route 220. The ferry operates 24 hours a day, 7 days a week. Boat operators are on duty 24 hours a day to provide service to individual passengers and motorists crossing Steamboat Slough.

The ferry is served by the vessel J-Mack (or J-Mac) which is a 92-foot-long by 32-foot-wide cable drawn ferry that can carry up to six vehicles. There is a 15-ton weight limit, tractor-trailers are prohibited, and the length limit is at the discretion of the Coast Guard.

Ryer Island is also connected via highway 84 on the other Caltrans delta ferry, to the southwest via the Ryer Island Ferry towards Rio Vista, and north via a bridge towards West Sacramento.

References

Ferries on the California highway system
Cable ferries in the United States